Elections to the Nairn District Council took place in May 1992, alongside elections to the councils of Scotland's various other districts.

Aggregate results

 

The Labour and Conservative candidates were elected unopposed

References

1992 Scottish local elections
Nairn District Council elections